Robert Pierson may refer to:
 Robert H. Pierson (1911–1989), leading figure in the Seventh Day Adventists
 Robert Laughlin Pierson (1926–1997), Episcopal clergyman and Freedom Rider
 Robert Scott Pierson, Canadian shipping magnate
 MV Robert S. Pierson, a lake freighter built in 1973
 Robert Pierson (minister) (died 1673), clergyman
 Robert Pierson (undercover officer), testified at the Chicago 7 trial, see Chicago 10
 Robert Pierson (voice actor), see Iczer Girl Iczelion